The Ivorian ambassador in Beijing is the official representative of the Government in Abidjan to the Government of the People's Republic of China.

List of representatives

References 

China
Ivory Coast
Ambassadors of Ivory Coast to China